The Forsyth Classic was an event on the Symetra Tour, the LPGA's developmental tour. It had been a part of the Symetra Tour's schedule since 1985. It was held at the Hickory Point Golf Course in Decatur, Illinois. 

Since 2006, the tournament had been the Symetra Tour's first and only major championship. The tournament underwent two changes for its first season as a major tournament: it became the Tour's first 72-hole event, and the purse increased to $100,000 with the winner receiving $14,000. The winner also receives a sponsor's exemption into the LPGA's State Farm Classic tournament.

From 2010 to 2012, the title sponsor of the tournament was Tate & Lyle, a multinational agri-processor based in England. Between 2013 and 2016, they remained the presenting sponsor.

Winners

References

External links
Coverage on Symetra Tour's official site

Former Symetra Tour events
Women's major golf championships
Golf in Illinois
Sports in Decatur, Illinois
Recurring sporting events established in 1985
Recurring sporting events established in 2019
1985 establishments in Illinois
2019 establishments in Illinois
Tate & Lyle